Wulfstan may refer to:
Wulfstan of Hedeby, 9th-century merchantman and traveller
Wulfstan (died 956), Archbishop of York
Wulfstan (died 1023), Bishop of Worcester, Bishop of London and Archbishop of York
Wulfstan (died 1095), Bishop of Worcester (sometimes known as St. Wulfstan II)
Wulfstan the Cantor (c. 960 – early 11th century), monk and poet